Jason Moore may refer to:

Sports
Jason Moore (safety) (born 1976), American football defensive back
Jason Moore (wide receiver) (born 1995), American football wide receiver
Jason Moore (racing driver) (born 1988), British motor racing driver
Jason Moore (soccer) (born 1978), American soccer player

Others
Jason Moore (director) (born 1970), American theater and movie director
Jason Moore (Wikipedia editor) (born 1984 or 1985), Wikipedia editor and organizer
Jason H. Moore, American computational geneticist and translational bioinformatician
Jason R. Moore, Jamaican-American actor

See also
Jayson More (born 1969), Canadian ice hockey player